Haddo Peak is a summit in Alberta, Canada. Haddo Peak is located in the Lake Louise area of Banff National Park.

Haddo Peak honors the name of George Gordon, Lord Haddo. Named in 1916, the name became official in 1952.

Geology

Like other mountains in Banff Park, Haddo Peak is composed of sedimentary rock laid down from the Precambrian to Jurassic periods. Formed in shallow seas, this sedimentary rock was pushed east and over the top of younger rock during the Laramide orogeny.

Climate
Based on the Köppen climate classification, Haddo Peak is located in a subarctic climate zone with cold, snowy winters, and mild summers. Winter temperatures can drop below  with wind chill factors below . Weather conditions during summer months are optimum for climbing.

See also
 List of mountains in the Canadian Rockies
 Geology of Alberta

References

Gallery

External links
 Parks Canada web site: Banff National Park

Haddo Peak
Haddo Peak
Canadian Rockies